CECP may refer to:

 Chess Engine Communication Protocol
 Certified Executive Compensation Professional, a certification offered by WorldatWork
 Civil Estate Co-ordination Protocol, a set of guidelines related to management of the public estate in the United Kingdom
 CE-CP, a circular permutation in proteins
 Country Extended Code Page, EBCDIC encodings for the ISO-8859-1 character repertoire